The White League, also known as the White Man's League, was a white paramilitary terrorist organization started in the Southern United States in 1874 to intimidate freedmen into not voting and prevent Republican Party political organizing. Its first chapter was formed in Grant Parish, Louisiana, and neighboring parishes and was made up of many of the Confederate veterans who had participated in the Colfax massacre in April 1873. Chapters were soon founded in New Orleans and other areas of the state.

Members of the White League were absorbed into the state militias and the National Guard.

History

Although sometimes linked to the secret vigilante groups the Ku Klux Klan and Knights of the White Camelia, the White League and other paramilitary groups of the later 1870s marked a significant change. They operated openly in communities, solicited coverage from newspapers, and the men's identities were generally known.  Similar paramilitary groups were chapters of the Red Shirts, started in Mississippi in 1875 and active also in North and South Carolina. They had explicit political goals to overthrow the Reconstruction government.  They directed their activities toward intimidation and removal of Northern and African American Republican candidates and officeholders.  Made up of well-armed Confederate veterans, they worked to turn Republicans out of office, disrupt their political organizing, and use force to intimidate and terrorize freedmen to keep them from the polls. Backers helped finance purchases of up-to-date arms: Winchester rifles, Colt revolvers and Prussian needle guns.

Some sources charge the White League with culpability for the Colfax Massacre of 1873, but the organization was not established under that name until March 1874. Christopher Columbus Nash, a Confederate veteran, former prisoner of war at Johnson's Island in Ohio, and the former sheriff of Grant Parish, led companies of white militia at Colfax to oust Republican officeholders and African Americans defending the courthouse; his forces murdered up to 150 African Americans in the Colfax Massacre, an event in which three white men were killed, one possibly by friendly fire.

The first unit of the White League, founded in 1874, was composed of members of Nash's force, mostly Confederate veterans who had participated in the Colfax Massacre.  It expressed its purpose to defend a "hereditary civilization and Christianity menaced by a stupid Africanization."

In 1874, White League members murdered Julie Hayden, a 17-year-old African American girl who was working as a schoolteacher in Hartsville, Tennessee.

In his December 1874 State of the Union address, U.S. President Ulysses S. Grant expressed disdain over the White League's activities, condemning them for their violence and for violating the civil rights of freedmen:

The Coushatta massacre occurred in another Red River parish: the local White League forced six Republican officeholders to resign and promise to leave the state. The League assassinated the men before they left the parish, together with between five and twenty freedmen (sources differ) who were witnesses. Generally in remote areas, the White League's show of force and outright murders always overcame opposition. They were Confederate veterans, experienced and well armed.

Later in 1874, the New Orleans Metropolitan Police, established as a state militia by the Republican governor, attempted to intercept a shipment of arms to the League. The League had entered the city to try to take over state government, in the aftermath of the disputed 1872 gubernatorial election.  In the subsequent Battle of Liberty Place on September 14, 1874, 5,000 members of the White League routed 3,500 police and state militia to turn out the Republican governor. They demanded the resignation of Governor William Pitt Kellogg in favor of John McEnery, the Democratic candidate. Kellogg refused and the White League briefly fought a battle resulting in 100 casualties. They took over and controlled the State House, City Hall and arsenal for three days, withdrawing just ahead of Federal troops and ships' arriving to reinforce the government. Kellogg had requested aid from U.S. President Ulysses S. Grant; once the troops arrived, he was restored to office.

President Grant sent additional troops within a month in another effort to try to pacify the Red River valley in northern Louisiana.  It had been plagued by violence, including the massacres at Colfax in 1873 and Coushatta in 1874. The White League was effective; voting by Republicans decreased and Democrats regained control of the state legislature in 1876.

Legacy
A Battle of Liberty Place Monument was erected in New Orleans in 1891. The monument initially celebrated the Battle of Liberty Place, also known as the Battle of Canal Street, which was a failed coup d'état and riot lead by White League paramilitary terrorists in September of 1874. In December 2016, the city council voted to remove the monument, and its removal was upheld by a federal appeals court in March 2017.

See also

History of New Orleans
Redeemers

Citations

References

 
Neo-Confederate organizations
Paramilitary organizations based in the United States
Presidency of Ulysses S. Grant
History of Louisiana
Organizations established in 1874
1874 establishments in Louisiana
Organizations disestablished in 1876
1876 disestablishments in Louisiana
Factions in the Democratic Party (United States)
Reconstruction Era
Right-wing militia organizations in the United States
African-American history of Louisiana
History of racism in Louisiana